The  was set up in Nakano, Tokyo in 1958, as Tokyo Photo School (Tōkyō Foto Sukūru); its current name dates from 1960. During the 1960s, it moved to Hiyoshi (Yokohama), where it has remained.

Notable graduates
Tadasuke Akiyama
Takanobu Hayashi
Eiji Ina
Norio Kobayashi
Shisei Kuwabara
Seiichi Motohashi
Kishin Shinoyama
Shinzō Hanabusa
Bishin Jumonji
Osamu Kanemura
Satoshi Kuribayashi
Mitsugu Ōnishi
Ko Si-chi
Issei Suda
Akihide Tamura
Hiromi Tsuchida
Kanendo Watanabe.

References

External links
 Tokyo College of Photography (Japanese)

Educational institutions established in 1958
Japanese vocational colleges
Japanese photography organizations
Tokyo College of Photography
Art education organizations
Arts organizations established in 1958
1958 establishments in Japan